John Ogilvie (1833-1888), and his brothers, Alexander Walker Ogilvie and William Watson Ogilvie took over their father Alexander's flour business in 1856 and expanded it into what would subsequently become the largest millers and exporters in the British Empire. The brothers played a historic role in Canada's agricultural and industrial development.

Early years
Ogilvie was born at the family farmhouse at Côte-Saint-Michel, Lower Canada (now Quebec) on January 8, 1833, the second son of Alexander Ogilvie and Helen Watson. He received his early education from Mr. Gibson, a Scotsman employed by the English speaking residents of the district to teach their children. He attended high school in Montreal. He lived with his parents working on their farm until April 1855 when he moved to Montreal.

Business career

A.W. Oglivie & Co.
In Montreal, Ogilvie became the first partner of his elder brother Alexander with A. W. Ogilvie & Co., millers and grain dealers, opening their first mill in 1856. The third brother, William Watson, joined them in 1860 and the brothers administered the company for the next forty years as it became Canada's largest flour miller and exporter.

Initially, the firm had only one mill, "Glenora", in Montreal but during the following years expanded its operations to mills in Ontario at Goderich and Seaforth.  John, despite objections from those who questioned his sanity in investing in the unsettled West, was one of the few to see the potential of Canadian prairie wheat. The company purchased several thousand acres of prairie land and built numerous wheat elevators and the extensive Winnipeg flour mills. John was in charge of construction and during the last years of his life spent almost half his time in Ontario and Manitoba managing the company's expansion. He had a  reputation as a shrewd and successful businessman. When Alexander retired from the family business in 1874, John became head of the firm until his death in 1888.

Public service
Unlike his brothers, he shied away from public life. He was a Justice of the Peace for the District of Montreal and as a young man was in the Montreal troop of cavalry commanded by his brother, Alexander.  He was one of the earliest life members of the St. Andrew's Society. He was a governor of the Montreal General Hospital and a member of the American Presbyterian Church on Dorchester (now Rene Levesque) Blvd.

Marriage and family life

On April 28, 1863 he married Margaret Watson (1839-1915), whose father, Thomas Watson, of Brown & Watson, contractors, was involved in the construction of the Victoria Bridge and the Lachine Canal.  They had 9 children of whom 8 survived to adulthood.

John Ogilvie's health suffered in 1868 when he was thrown from a horse and dragged along the road causing severe injuries. He visited specialists in Britain who did not think he would live much longer.  He was unable to exercise as a result of these accidents and suffered from heart problems in his later years. In the hope of restoring his health, he and his wife visited New Mexico, California, and Vancouver in the spring of 1888. He died on July 23, 1888 of heart disease, and is buried in Mount Royal Cemetery.

On the day of his death at a meeting of the Montreal Corn Exchange Association, Mr Edgar Judge paid the following tribute:

References

Canadian people of Scottish descent
Canadian business families
Anglophone Quebec people
1833 births
1888 deaths
Burials at Mount Royal Cemetery